Polana (minor planet designation: 142 Polana) is a very dark asteroid from the asteroid belt. It was discovered by Johann Palisa on January 28, 1875, and named after the city of Pola (now Pula, Croatia), home of the Austrian Naval Observatory where he made the discovery.

It is a major member of the eponymously named Polana family, which is a subgroup of the Nysa family. The asteroid has an estimated diameter of about 55.3 km and a low albedo of 0.045. It is  orbiting at a distance of 2.419 times the separation of the Earth from the Sun, with an orbital period of 3.76 years and an eccentricity of 0.14.

In the Tholen classification scheme, Polana is a primitive carbonaceous asteroid of type F, which is a subdivision of more common C-type. Under the SMASS classification taxonomy, Polana is listed as a B-type asteroid; a group that combines both the Tholen B and F types. The spectrum of this object suggests the presence of magnetite (Fe3O4), which gives it the spectrally blue coloration that is a characteristic of this SMASS class.

Mars resonance 
Polana is in a 1:2 orbital resonance with Mars, meaning that Polana orbits the Sun once for every two orbits that Mars completes. This resonance helps protect the asteroid from orbital erosion: the orbital eccentricities of the resonant asteroids are clearly greater than the non-resonant asteroids. There is a peak in the number of asteroids located at 2.419 AU from the Sun. In spite of strong perturbations caused by the passing of both Jupiter and Mars, the 1:2 Mars resonance brings about stability for billions of years. There are up to 1,500 asteroids in this resonance, and the resonance between Polana and Mars will strengthen over the next million years due to Polana transitioning into a strong libration period with Mars.

References

External links 
 Asteroids inside the resonance 1:2 with Mars, Tabaré Gallardo
 
 

000142
Discoveries by Johann Palisa
Named minor planets
Mars
000142
000142
18750128